The Laser 4.7 World Championships have been held every year since 2002, organized by the International Sailing Federation. The event is open to young under 18.

Editions

Medalists

Boys

Girls

See also
ISAF Sailing World Championships
Laser World Championships
Men's Laser Radial World Championships
Women's Laser Radial World Championships

References

External links
World Champs – Laser 4.7
Sailing World Championships – Men Laser 4.7 from site Sports123.com (by Internet Archive)
Sailing World Championships – Women Laser Radial from site Sports123.com (by Internet Archive)

 
Recurring sporting events established in 2002
Laser 4.7 competitions